Sirens is the debut studio album by English electronic music production duo Gorgon City. It was released on 6 October 2014. The album features vocals from Katy B and Jennifer Hudson among others, and writing credits from Kiesza and Emeli Sandé among others. The album debuted at number 10 on the UK Albums Chart.

Singles
 "Real" was released as the album's lead single on 17 February 2013; it was also the title track to the EP Real, accompanied by three non-album songs. The song features vocals by Yasmin, and peaked at number 44 on the UK Singles Chart.
 "Ready for Your Love" was released on 26 January 2014 as the album's second single. It features vocals by MNEK and entered the UK Singles Chart at number four.
 "Here for You" was released as the album's third single on 26 May 2014. It features vocals by Laura Welsh. The song entered the UK Singles Chart at number seven.
 "Unmissable" was released as the album's fourth single on 28 September 2014. It features vocals by Zak Abel. The song entered the UK Singles Chart at number nineteen.
 "Go All Night" was released as the album's fifth single on 14 December 2014. It features vocals by American recording artist Jennifer Hudson. The single peaked at number fourteen on the UK Singles Chart, becoming Hudson's first top 20 single in Britain since 2008's "Spotlight".
 "Imagination" was released in the form of a Beatport-exclusive remix package on 17 March 2015.

Promotional singles
 "Lover Like You" was released as iTunes UK's "Single of the Week" for free download on 13 October 2014. It features vocals by Katy B.

Track listing

Notes:
 "Doing It Wrong" is a cover of the song by Drake featuring Stevie Wonder.

Charts

Certifications

Release history

References

2014 debut albums
Gorgon City albums
Virgin EMI Records albums
Black Butter Records albums